The 1989 Australian motorcycle Grand Prix was the second round of the 1989 Grand Prix motorcycle racing season. It took place on the weekend of 7–9 April 1989 at Phillip Island and was the first ever World Championship Motorcycle Grand Prix to take place in Australia.

500 cc race report
Green light on the 5-row grid sees Wayne Rainey, Tadahiko Taira and Kevin Schwantz head into the first turn in front of the field, with Wayne Gardner in 4th. Second lap in 2nd place, Schwantz gets on the throttle while looking behind him and highsides out of Turn Ten; as he walked away from his Suzuki, he looked like he wished he did not know the guy who just binned it so foolishly.

Rainey pulled out a lead of more than a second, followed by Kevin Magee, Taira, Gardner, Mick Doohan and Eddie Lawson. Eventually, Gardner got past Magee at Turn Four, and Pierfrancesco Chili crashed out for the second successive race. Gardner caught Rainey and began to swap the lead, while Magee, Christian Sarron, Freddie Spencer and Lawson closed in. Sarron caught and goes to the front, with the leaders, while Magee hung on in 4th spot. Spencer fell off and did not finish.

Last lap: Gardner, Rainey, Sarron and a small gap to Magee. Rainey's early break may have cost him rubber, because he seemed desperate to find a different line that will get him to slide his way past Gardner, but nothing works, with Gardner winning the race, followed by Rainey and Sarron.

Rainey: "Gardner ran into the back of me twice, and didn’t even notice. He was one of the sloppiest guys I ever raced – he reminded me of a bulldog on a bike. When he was on a good day, he could ride that thing right out of the saddle. He was a bit like Kevin, but more out of control. Not a thinking racer: he rode by the excitement of the crowd. If nobody was there I think he wouldn’t do much".

500 cc classification

References

Australian motorcycle Grand Prix
Australian
Motorcycle
Motorsport at Phillip Island